Acestridium discus is a species of armored catfish in the genus Acestridium.
It is native to South America.

References

Fish of South America
Hypoptopomatini